Shmidta is a rural locality (a settlement) in Novorossiysky Selsoviet, Rubtsovsky District, Altai Krai, Russia. The population was 91 as of 2013. There is 1 street.

Geography 
Shmidta is located 46 km north of Rubtsovsk (the district's administrative centre) by road. Novorossiysky is the nearest rural locality.

References 

Rural localities in Rubtsovsky District